Phyllium mabantai is a species of leaf insect in the family Phylliidae. It is endemic to the Philippines.

Taxonomy 
The species was described based on a female holotype from Lake Agko in the Philippines. The holotype is currently stored in the Royal Belgian Institute of Natural Sciences.

Distribution 
Phyllium mabantai is endemic to the Philippines, where it is found on the islands of Mindanao, Samar, and Leyte.

References 

Insects described in 2009
Phylliidae
Insects of Asia